MLB The Show 20 is a baseball video game by Sony Interactive Entertainment and published by Sony Interactive Entertainment, based on Major League Baseball (MLB). The fifteenth entry of the MLB: The Show franchise, it was officially released on March 17, but customers that digitally pre-ordered the game were given an early release on March 13. Chicago Cubs infielder Javier Báez is featured as the cover star.

For the first time ever, Minor League Baseball players are fully licensed and have their names and likenesses featured in the game. In previous versions of the game, Minor League players were not licensed and were replaced with generic players. As well, the team and logo editor that were previously exclusive to Diamond Dynasty were brought over to the game's Franchise mode.

Matt Vasgersian, Mark DeRosa & Dan Plesac return as play-by-play commentators; Heidi Watney returns as sideline reporter and Alex Miniak returns as public address commentator.

Upon release, MLB The Show 20 was generally well-received by critics, who praised the new fielding and hitting mechanics, and new features in the Diamond Dynasty mode, while criticism was given to technical issues at launch.

MLB The Show 20 is the final game in the series to be a PlayStation-exclusive, as its successor, MLB The Show 21 also released on Xbox.

Development
New features in the game include online modes such as "Showdown" and "Custom Leagues". "Showdown" is a mode that begins with a player selected in a draft, and it will use in the "Moments" mode. The "Custom Leagues" mode is another online-only mode that using the choice of 40-man live MLB roster or create a custom team from the MLB The Shows "Diamond Dynasty" mode.

Returning favorites "Franchise Mode" (in which the player can take control of any MLB team over the course of several seasons, but with the new customized team and logo creator and franchise relocation option, in which the player will create a team, the team's logo or relocate the team to designated location), "Road to the Show" (in which the user creates a new player and plays out his career through Double-A, Triple-A and the majors), "March To October" (in which the player will select the team for a full MLB season through the regular season, the All-Star Game, the playoffs, and the World Series), and "Moments" (which the user relive and recreate famous moments in MLB history).

In addition, the game will feature real-life, fully licensed Minor League Baseball players for the first time ever, unlike in previous games where the real players are not licensed and were replaced with generic players, in conjunction with Scott Spindler and his Ridin Rosters group.

The game features the new Nike uniforms for the very first time, previous games have formerly used Majestic Athletic as their uniform supplier.

The game will now also include real-life and authentic stadium advertisements for the first time, previous games in the series did not include authentic stadium advertisements and replaced it with fake brands. Advertisements for Chevrolet, Chick-fil-A, Coca-Cola, Citgo, Delta Air Lines, John Hancock Insurance, PNC Bank, and Wintrust Financial are now seen in these selected stadiums within the game.

Reception 

MLB The Show 20 received "generally favorable reviews" from critics, according to Metacritic.

In its 8.7/10 review, IGN wrote: "MLB The Show 20 isn't the biggest upgrade the series has ever seen, but it's a solid one with a few good highlights and no real downsides." Game Informer gave the game 8.75/10, praising its new hitting and fielding mechanics and new features in Diamond Dynasty, "Another good outing for the series, complete with additions across the board and gameplay that emphasizes skill." GameSpot gave the game 8/10, praising the fielding and hitting mechanics, but criticizing the new custom teams and Online Leagues additions.

Soundtrack

References

2020 video games
20
Multiplayer and single-player video games
PlayStation 4 games
PlayStation 4-only games
Sony Interactive Entertainment games
Sports video games with career mode
Video games developed in the United States
Video games set in Canada
Video games set in the United States
Video games set in Maryland
San Diego Studio games